Alcatraz Island has appeared many times in popular culture. Its appeal as a picturesque film setting derives from its natural beauty, isolation and its history as a prison (now a museum) from which, officially, no prisoner ever successfully escaped.

Prisoners
Most appearances of Alcatraz island in popular culture are related to its former status as a federal prison. Both real life and fictional accounts of imprisonment on the island have been popular.

One of the best-known of Alcatraz's historic inmates was Robert Franklin Stroud, known as "The Birdman of Alcatraz". His biography was written by Thomas E. Gaddis and then adapted into a film in 1962, with Burt Lancaster playing the lead role.

The 1995 film Murder in the First depicts a man who spends three years in solitary confinement at the prison.
One of the prisoners, Kyle Oberholzer, was charged with rape, murder and fornicating.

Portrayals in arts, media, and entertainment

Common fictional themes

Escape attempts
Many films and television series have exploited Alcatraz Island's reputation as a prison from which it was almost impossible to escape. For example:

 Brute Force (1947), starring Burt Lancaster, although inspired by actual events during the Battle of Alcatraz, is a highly fictionalized account of an attempted prison break. It was unusual at the time for the level of violence it portrayed.
 Birdman of Alcatraz (1962), starring Burt Lancaster, briefly depicts a largely fictional version of the battle which, from the start, is portrayed as a full-scale riot rather than a discrete escape attempt. Robert Stroud, the "Birdman of Alcatraz", is given unwarranted credit for ending the conflict.
 Don Siegel's thriller Escape from Alcatraz (1979) portrays both the conditions of life in the prison and the difficulty of escaping from it, and chronicles the story of Frank Morris and brothers John and Clarence Anglin, who escaped from Alcatraz in 1962, although it is not known whether the three escapees survived. The film implies that the escape succeeded.
 Alcatraz — The Whole Shocking Story (1980) is a factually based TV drama of the events of the Battle of Alcatraz, incorporated into a larger narrative of the history of Alcatraz as seen through the eyes of its youngest prisoner, Clarence Carnes.
 Six Against the Rock (1987), starring David Carradine as Bernard Coy, is based on the semi-fictional book by Clark Howard.
Alcatraz (2018), is an independent film depicting the Battle of Alcatraz.

Hostages
Alcatraz's isolated and fortified image has meant that it has been used as a location for fictional hostage scenarios in various instances.
Terrorists use Alcatraz as a hiding-place after taking the Mayor of San Francisco hostage in the third Dirty Harry film, The Enforcer (1976)
The most successful of such films was The Rock (1996), in which a group from the United States Marine Corps Force Reconnaissance holds 81 tourists hostage, demanding monetary reparations; to defeat the hostage-takers, the Navy SEAL team enlists the help and knowledge of John Patrick Mason, the only inmate of Alcatraz who ever successfully escaped

Safe haven
Alcatraz has also been portrayed often as a safe haven or base of operations in post-apocalyptic fiction, such as the film The Book of Eli (2010).

Portrayals

Multimedia franchises
 The Harry Potter franchise features a wizarding island prison called Azkaban which is partly based on Alcatraz.

Films
 Al Capone (1959) ends with the once-powerful crime boss being attacked by other prisoners after being sent to "The Rock" for income-tax evasion
 Alcatraz: The Whole Shocking Story (1980) stars Michael Beck and was directed by Paul Krasny
In All Dogs Go to Heaven 2 (1996), Carface turns Alcatraz into the Devil's temple and a prison for angels.
 Birdman of Alcatraz (1962), starring Burt Lancaster and directed by John Frankenheimer, is based on Thomas E. Gaddis' eponymous 1955 biography of Robert Stroud
 In Cats & Dogs: The Revenge of Kitty Galore (2010), Mr. Tinkles was locked up in a hidden prison on Alcatraz Island as a mental patient.
 Escape from Alcatraz (1979), starring Clint Eastwood and directed by Don Siegel
 Half Past Dead (2002) action movie starring Steven Seagal, setting of the movie is at a modern Alcatraz
 King of Alcatraz (1938), starring Gail Patrick and directed by Robert Florey
 Meteor Storm (2010)
 Murder in the First (1995), a drama film about a fictionalized inmate at Alcatraz.
 Occupation of Alcatraz 1969, a documentary about the protest occupation of (the then defunct) Alcatraz
 Point Blank (1967). This was the first major motion picture to be filmed on location at Alcatraz Island after the closure of the Federal prison in 1963
 In the Popeye the Sailor animated cartoon "Private Eye Popeye" (released on November 12, 1954), Alcatraz Island is where Popeye knocks the cartoon's main antagonist into after gaining a fresh burst of strength from eating spinach
 So I Married An Axe Murderer
 Star Trek Into Darkness, a 2013 science-fiction movie, in which the facility is destroyed when Khan crashes his derelict starship into San Francisco
 The Book of Eli (2010) post-apocalyptic film that ends on Alcatraz
 The Enforcer The third Dirty Harry, (1976), movie climaxes with a shoot-out on Alcatraz
 The Rock (1996), with Sean Connery, Nicolas Cage, and Ed Harris, takes place at Alcatraz Island, featuring a rogue U.S. Marine Brigadier General and US Force Recon Marines who have taken over the island, stolen and are threatening to launch dangerous M55  rocket missiles filled with deadly VX gas, to eradicate large parts of San Francisco unless they are paid $100 million, forcing a government strike team to recruit John Mason (Connery), a former SAS operative and the only man to ever escape "the Rock", in order to break in and stop them
 What's New Scooby-Doo?: Scooby and the gang investigate Alcatraz prison in order to solve the mystery regarding San Franpsycho, the ghost of a former Alcatraz inmate
 X-Men: The Last Stand features Alcatraz as the development center for a "cure" for mutants
 The 1984 movie Electric Dreams features the two lead characters on a date going on a tour of the facility. Their tour depicted the isolation cells, the recreation yard, and parts of the island shore.

Games
The focus of 1954: Alcatraz (released in 2014), a point-and-click adventure by Daedalic Entertainment, is split between two separate player characters: Joe, who has been sent to Alcatraz Prison for being involved in a robbery, and his wife Christine, who works on the outside in San Francisco trying to aid him in his escape
Alcatraz (video game), a 1992 sequel to the Infogrames game (the sequel to Hostages), involves US Navy SEALS infiltrating a terrorist-occupied Alcatraz and foil their plans
Alcatraz: Prison Escape (released worldwide on November 23, 2001), developed by Zombie Studios and published by Activision Value, is a computer game based on, but not directly referencing, some famous escapes from the prison facility
In Call of Duty: Black Ops II, DLC "Uprising", a zombies map titled "Mob of the Dead" takes place in a twisted, nightmarish version of Alcatraz Island, inhabited by zombies; however, it is not the real Alcatraz; it is more like a purgatory for the four characters
 In the Call of Duty: Black Ops III final zombie map, "Revelations", Alcatraz Island makes a cameo appearance 
In Call of Duty: Black Ops 4 (2018), Alcatraz is the setting for the zombies map "Blood of the Dead"
In Call of Duty: Mobile, Alcatraz is a Battle Royale map first introduced in 2020 as part of the first anniversary event
In Call of Duty: Warzone (2020), Alcatraz is a Battle Royale map, under the name "Rebirth Island".
 In Cause of Death, Alcatraz island appears in the last chapters of the first and fifth volumes
In the RTS video game Command & Conquer: Yuri's Revenge, Alcatraz is featured in the introduction video setting up for its single-player campaign. The villain, Yuri, former leader of Soviet Psychic Crops, had built a Psychic Dominator and power plant on Alcatraz Island, as part of his global mind-controlling device network. The Allied Harriers launched an air strike but failed. In the  campaign, the player as commander must destroy the Psychic Dominator with the time shift by The Time Machine.
In Crysis 2, the name of the main character is Alcatraz
 Escape from Alcatraz (2017), is a real time escape room game from EscapeSF in San Francisco, that replicates the environment with using original props and background electronics 
In Half-Life 2, The Combine Prison Nova Prospekt is heavily based on Alcatraz
 In Homefront, during the mission on the Golden Gate Bridge, it is mentioned that US Navy SEAL Team Six has taken control of Alcatraz; it can also be seen in the distance
 In Hulk, there are two chapters (five levels) that take place in Alcatraz 
In the arcade game rail shooter L.A. Machineguns: Rage of the Machines, a maximum security prison is established on Alcatraz Island in the year 2025, which falls under attack to the titular Rage of the Machines, a robotic terrorist force that attempts to free a number of convicts in the process.  The player is tasked in thwarting the robots' assault, before taking on their leader, a larger amphibious robot named Xenophobia.
 The Albatross Island Prison in Lego City Undercover is based on Alcatraz Island.
In Manhunter 2: San Francisco, the player visits alien-occupied Alcatraz near the end of the game and frees captive mutants from the alien Orbs.
In Mean Streets, Tex Murphy visits Alcatraz at the end of the game, which houses the huge "Overlord" computer and then proceed to activate its self-destruct sequence.
In Operation 7, an online free to play first person shooter managed by Netgame, Alcatraz is a playable map popular for the demolition or survival modes. It features a realistic map based on the cell blocks, cafeteria, and basement of the prison, finished with music that provides a creepy tone.
 The game RollerCoaster Tycoon 2 has a scenario setting on the island, some time after the prison was closed down and abandoned.
 The game RuneScape sends the player to an "escape-proof" island known as The Rock.
Alcatraz also appears in Rush 2: Extreme Racing USA again using the same layout as San Francisco Rush: The Rock.
 The Stilwater Penitentiary in Saints Row 2 is based on Alcatraz.
 In the video game San Francisco Rush: The Rock, Alcatraz is the main setting. Players race cars on, above, and through the prison and the island. 
 In the Ghostlight  video game Shadow Hearts: From the New World (developed in 2005), the party travels to Alcatraz to bust out Al Capone, who was formerly a real-life prisoner of the island.
 In the simulation game SimCity 3000, players can build Alcatraz Complex as their city's landmark.
Sim City 4 (released in January 2003) used Alcatraz as an historical building. It was developed by Maxis and published by Electronic Arts.
 In the game Tom Clancy's Rainbow Six 3, several hostages must be rescued from Alcatraz Prison.
 In the video game, Tony Hawk's Pro Skater 4 (2002), the island is featured as a playable level and has many features of the real Alcatraz.
 The video game Urban Strike features Alcatraz as one of the secret bases of main antagonist H. R. Malone.
 In the video game Watch Dogs 2, the player can walk around and visit Alcatraz Island.
 In the MMORPG, World of Warcraft: The Burning Crusade there is a reference to Alcatraz through the Tempest Keep dungeon wing: The Arcatraz
 Saints Row 2
 In The Escapists Alcatraz is a DLC prison.
In Guitar Hero 3, Alcatraz is a part of the venues of this game, renamed to Shanker's Island

Literature

Fiction
 Al Capone Does My Shirts and Al Capone Shines My Shoes are historical fiction young adult novels by Gennifer Choldenko, about a boy and his autistic sister living on Alcatraz Island
 In Baccano!, the hitman Ladd Russo is imprisoned in 1932 and subsequently transferred to Alcatraz in 1934. The story arc "Alice in Jails" focuses on this and other inmates of Alcatraz prison.
 In Battle of the Labyrinth, the fourth Percy Jackson book, a Labyrinth entrance is located in one of the cells on Alcatraz Island and the worst nightmare of the Cyclopes, Kampê, is a prison guard at Alcatraz.
 In an issue of Psi-Force, the group takes a sightseeing tour to Alcatraz and winds up getting attacked and temporarily imprisoned there.
 The Secrets of the Immortal Nicholas Flamel fantasy novels series by Michael Scott features Alcatraz in, for example, The Alchemyst: The Secrets of the Immortal Nicholas Flamel (2007), The Magician (2008) - in which Alcatraz is depicted as a prison for the immortal Perenelle Flamel, and The Sorceress: The Secrets of the Immortal Nicholas Flamel (2009)
After the mass depowerment of the mutant race, the superhero team the X-Men move to Alcatraz and make it a safe haven for all mutants, renaming it Utopia

Memoirs
A number of books were written or co-authored by former Alcatraz prisoners, e.g.:
 Alcatraz: The True End of the Line, an autobiography by former inmate Darwin Coon
Alcatraz from Inside and Alcatraz from Inside: The Hard Years, 1942–1952, by former inmate Jim Quillen
From Alcatraz to the  White House: An Autobiography, by former inmate Nathan Glenn Williams
On the Rock: Twenty-five years in Alcatraz: The prison story of Alvin Karpis as told to Robert Livesey,  coauthored by Alvin Karpis, the longest-held prisoner at Alcatraz
Public Enemy No. 1: The Alvin Karpis Story,  coauthored by Alvin Karpis
 The Birdman of Alcatraz (1955), Thomas E. Gaddis' 1955 biography of Robert Stroud, which was adapted as an eponymous 1962 film
 Alcatraz #1259 (2012), William G. Baker' 2012 biography of William G. Baker, and his experience of being a prisoner of Alcatraz.

Other non-fiction books about Alcatraz
 Escape from Alcatraz (1963), by J. Campbell Bruce
 Last Guard Out: A Riveting Account by the Last Guard to Leave Alcatraz (2008)), by Jim Albright

Music

Groups
 Alkatraz, a Welsh rock band including former members of Quicksand  
 Alcatrazz, a former American Heavy Metal band (1983–1987), notable for launching the careers of famed guitarists Steve Vai and Yngwie Malmsteen; "Island in the Sun" (1983), the band's debut single, makes multiple lyrical references to Alcatraz Island
 Alkatrazz, a former British heavy metal band (1981–1983)

Albums
The Rock: Pressure Makes Diamonds (2006) is an album by the rapper San Quinn

Songs
 "17 Hills", by Thomas Dolby, from A Map of the Floating City (2011), narrates an ambiguously successful escape from Alcatraz
 "Alcatraz", by Benn hints at the Call of Duty map "Mob of the Dead"
 "Alcatraz", by the indie rock band Carbon Leaf, is a song on their 2013 album Constellation Prize (2013)
 "Alcatraz" is a song performed by June Carter Cash 
 "Alcatraz" is a song written by Leon Russell covered by Nazareth (band) on the album Razamanaz
 "Alcatraz", by the Proto-Punk Peruvian band Los Saicos, is sung from the point of view of a prisoner of the Rock
 "Alcatraz", a song on The New Jim Jones (1993) by Andre Nickatina, includes the lyric, "Frisco, the home of Alcatraz"
 "Alcatraz (Pelican Island)" is a song performed by Malvina Reynolds
 "Birdman of Alcatraz" is a song on Rick Wakeman's Criminal Record 
 "Bullet in the Head", by Rage Against the Machine, features the lyric, "every home was like Alcatraz"
 Norteño band Los Tigres Del Norte filmed the music video of "Jefe De Jefes" at the Alcatraz prison
 "Frank Morris", by the Christian rock band Capital Lights, tells the story of the escape attempt from the point of view of the prisoners
 In "Over The Wall", by the American bay area thrash metal band Testament, the lyrics talk about escaping Alcatraz
 "Save Me San Francisco", by the American rock band Train, mentions Alcatraz
 In a song from the musical The Addams Family, Gomez and Morticia Addams mention that they took a week long trip to Alcatraz

People
 Al Katrazz (born 1971), ringname of wrestler Brian Fleming

Television

Television series
 Alcatraz (2012), the short-lived TV series on Fox, starring Sam Neill, Jorge Garcia, Parminder Nagra, and Sarah Jones, and produced by J. J. Abrams, involves prisoners from Alcatraz - which was not closed due to budget reasons, but because all 302 residents mysteriously disappeared on March 20, 1963 - reappearing in the present day, requiring a makeshift task force to track down the inmates and prevent them from committing further crimes while also determining the reasons for their return

Television episodes
 In a two-part episode of Avatar: The Last Airbender there is a Fire Nation prison for war criminals similar to Alcatraz called "The Boiling Rock", situated on an island in a boiling lake. Until two characters, Sokka and Zuko, infiltrate the prison and rescue the former's captured father and girlfriend, nobody had ever successfully escaped from it.
 In Charmed episode 1.20, "The Power of Two", Prudence Halliwell and her sister Phoebe Halliwell vanquish the evil ghost of a serial killer who was jailed in the Alcatraz prison and is seeking revenge on his judge and jury. The sisters must figure out how to vanquish this evil spirit and prevent his killing again without the Power of Three, as their sister Piper is vacationing in Hawaii
 Ghost Adventures filmed season 8, episode 8 of paranormal ongoings at Alcatraz, on Travel Channel, titled "Ghost Adventures" (October 11, 2013)
 Ghost Hunterss 100th episode; season 6 episode 1 - "Alcatraz" (March 3, 2010), is a 2 hour premier special featuring a paranormal investigation at AlcatrazGhost Lab,  Discovery Channel's paranormal show, did an investigation of the prison in Season 1, episode 10: "Alcatraz" (December 8, 2009)
 The G.I. Joe animated series aired a two-part episode titled "D-Day at Alcatraz" (1990)
 Alcatraz appears in the Mummies Alive! episode, "Bird Mummy of Alcatraz"
 MythBusters aired "Alcatraz Escape" (December 12, 2003) on the Discovery Channel
 In the Phineas and Ferb episode, "Phineas and Ferb Get Busted!", the Smile Away Reformatory School is based on Alcatraz
 In the Scooby-Doo and Scrappy-Doo (1979 TV series), Daphne's sudden sea sickness and sightings of a female vampire might be tied together when the gang visits Alcatraz Island
 The Fairly OddParents features a prison in Fairy World called Abracatraz, based on Alcatraz.
 In The Mighty B! episode, "Tour D'Alcatraz", Bessie and Penny were mistaken by an officer as criminals while on a tour in Alcatraz.
 The Othersiders series finale featured an investigation of Alcatraz Prison
 In The Simpsons episode, "Bart-Mangled Banner", after the Simpsons get ostracized due to a misunderstanding, they get arrested and locked up in Alcatraz, along with people like Michael Moore and Bill Clinton
 In The Wild Wild West (1960's TV series) episode, "The Night of the Pelican", Secret Service agent James West goes undercover as a prisoner to Alcatraz
 The island location of the Duel Tower in the anime Yu-Gi-Oh!'' was inspired by Alcatraz Island, and is called "Alcatraz" in the Japanese-language version

References

See also

 
San Francisco in popular culture